Priyanka Kothari, often credited as Nisha Kothari  or Amoha, is an actress and model. She has appeared in Bollywood, Telugu, Tamil and Kannada films. She has frequently appeared in Ram Gopal Varma films.

Early life
Priyanka Kothari was born in West Bengal. She moved to New Delhi while in grade 10 and got her bachelor's degree in physical science from Delhi University at Dyal Singh College, Delhi. She chose chemistry as her father is a chemical businessman, while her mother is a home-maker. She has learnt Kathak for 6 years and attended acting classes with Kishore Namit Kapoor.

Career
After college, Kothari became a model and appeared in a number of advertisement campaigns. She appeared in the music video of the remix of Chadti Jawani Meri Chaal Mastani. In 2003, she got her big break through actor Madhavan, who recommended her for an audition in his film after viewing her photographs. She made her acting debut with him in the Tamil film Jay Jay, credited as Amoga. She made her Bollywood debut in the 2005 film  Sarkar and then later that same year appeared in James, directed by Ram Gopal Varma and Rohit Jugraj respectively. James turned her into a sex symbol overnight. She then went on to do The Killer with Emraan Hashmi. Since then she had appeared in less significant films and roles. She was regularly seen in Ram Gopal Varma's films like Shiva, Darna Zaroori Hai, Aag, in which she played a tapori called Ghungroo, Darling and Agyaat and also his productions like Go and Stalker. Most of the films were unsuccessful. She made her Sandalwood debut with Raaj the Showman opposite Puneeth Rajkumar in 2009 and later did a supporting role in Dandupalya. She was seen in a Telugu film with Balakrishna, Okka Magadu which also bombed and also acted in a film titled Hari Om.

Her only 2011 release was Bin Bulaye Baraati. In 2013, she appeared in a Malaysian Tamil film titled, Ops Kossa Dappa 3. She will be seen in the Tamil film Padam Pesum and has signed up a Telugu thriller titled Criminals.

Other work
Kothari is a member of the International Film And Television Club of Asian Academy of Film & Television. She is the co-founder of Nisha Foundation.

In the 2011 West Bengal state assembly elections, she campaigned for Dr Nirmal Majhi, an All India Trinamool Congress candidate contesting from North Uluberia, Kolkata.

In 2011, she walked the ramp at Wills Lifestyle India Fashion Week (WIFW), which she describes as her comeback in Bollywood.

Filmography

Music and Music Videos

References

External links

 
 

Actresses from Uttar Pradesh
Indian film actresses
Living people
Actresses in Tamil cinema
Female models from Uttar Pradesh
Actresses in Hindi cinema
Actresses in Kannada cinema
Actresses in Telugu cinema
21st-century Indian actresses
Delhi University alumni
Year of birth missing (living people)